This is a list of Viscounts of Béziers, who ruled the viscounty of Béziers.

 Reinard I of Béziers 881–897
 Adelaide of Béziers (daughter) 897– ? 
 Boso viscount of Agde 897–? (married to Adelaide)
 Teude of Béziers and Agde (son) ?–936
 Junus of Béziers and Agde (son) 936–960
 Reinard II of Béziers and Agde (son) 960–967
 Guillaume I of Béziers and Agde (son) 967–994
 Garsende of Béziers and Agde (daughter) 994–1034
 Bernard of Anduze 934–? (married to Garsende)
 Raymond I of Comminges (Raymond Roger I count of Carcassonne) (married to Garsende) 
 Pierre I of Carcassonne 1034–1059

The viscount of Béziers were also counts of Carcassonne from 1034.

Béziers
 
Béziers